Kanyalé is a town in the Imasgho Department of Boulkiemdé Province in central western Burkina Faso. It has a population of 1,954.

References

Populated places in Boulkiemdé Province